The Common Data Set (CDS) is a product of the Common Data Set Initiative, "a collaborative effort among data providers in the higher education community and publishers as represented by the College Board, Peterson's, and U.S. News & World Report." The stated goal is to provide accurate and timely data to students and their families while decreasing the workload of administrators.  In producing their popular publications and rankings, these publishers "ask the same core questions" of institutions using the Common Data Set to define those questions and their responses.  These data are also used in public accountability efforts such as the Voluntary System of Accountability's College Portrait.

Annual CDS survey results
Each year the Common Data Set initiative makes small changes to the "survey" submitted for every contributing college and university to complete.  While the resulting database of all responses is not available for download, individual colleges and universities typically publish their individual responses on their own website.

These individual responses can provide valuable information for students applying to a particular college or university.  For example, section C7 - "Relative Importance of Common Academic and Non-Academic Admission Criteria" – indicates the admission process for that college places on items like "Class Rank", "GPA", and "Extra-Curricular Activities". Another example is Sections C9 to C12, which give a statistical breakdown of SAT/ACT scores, class rank, and GPA for the current freshman class. This can be a good indicator, especially for the more selective colleges and universities, of the typical scores needed for admission.  Sections on "Tuition and Fees" and "Financial Aid" can help potential applicants to understand the typical costs and potential aid they might receive based on the current freshman class statistics.

Survey sections and topics
The CDS annual survey includes the following major sections, identified by major sections (A-J) and subsections (0, 1, 3, ...):
 A - General College Information: Address, Classification of Undergraduate Institution, Academic Year Calendar, Degrees Offered
 B - Enrollment and Persistence: Current Institutional Enrollment - Men and Women, Enrollment by Racial/Ethnic Category, Number of Degrees Awarded, Graduation Rates, Retention Rates
 C - First-Time, First-Year (Freshman) Admissions: Freshman Student Applicants (Admitted, Enrolled, Wait-Listed), Relative Importance of Common Academic and Non-Academic Admission Criteria, Admission Requirements (Diploma, GED, College Prep Program), HS Academic Subject Requirements, Open Enrollment, SAT & ACT Policies (Requirements, Deadlines), Existing Freshman Class Statistical Profile (SAT & ACT Scoring Breakdown, Class Rank Breakdown, HS GPA Breakdown), Average GPA, Admission Policies (Application Fees, Closing Dates, Notification Date(s)), Other Admission Policies
 D - Transfer Admissions: Transfer Students Accepted or Not, Number from Last Year, Transfer Enrollment Term(s), Other Transfer Requirements and Deadlines, Transfer Credit Policies
 E - Academic Offerings and Policies: Special Study Options, Academic Areas Required for Graduation
 F - Student Life: Freshman Information (Fraternities, On/Off Campus Housing, Full/Part-Time), Activities Offered, ROTC, Housing Types Offered
 G - Annual Expenses: Undergraduate Full-Time Costs (Tuition, Required Fees, Room and Board), Changes in Tuition by Instructional Program, Estimated Expenses for Residents and Commuters, Per-Credit Hour Fees
 H - Financial Aid: Need-Based and Non-Need Based Financial Aid Offered in $'s, Number of Enrolled Students and Average Aid Awarded (Need and Non-Need Based), Financial Aid Filing Deadlines, Types of Aid Available, Scholarships and Grant Available, Criteria used in Awarding Institutional Aid
 I - Instructional Faculty and Class Size: Faculty Demographics (Men/Women, Degrees, Full/Part-Time), Student-to-Faculty Ratio, Class Counts by Section/Sub-Section Size
J - Degrees Conferred by Disciplinary Areas

See also 
 Common data model

References

External links
 Official website

Educational organizations based in the United States